Langelsheim is a town in the district of Goslar in Lower Saxony, Germany.

Geography

Subdivisions
Langelsheim is divided into eight Ortschaften with the following population as of 30 June 2020:
 Astfeld (2,097 inhabitants)
 Bredelem (438 inhabitants)
 Hahausen (765 inhabitants)
 Langelsheim (5,067 inhabitants)
 Lautenthal (1,511 inhabitants)
 Lutter am Barenberge (2,296 inhabitants)
 Wallmoden (907 inhabitants)
 Wolfshagen im Harz (2,192 inhabitants)

History
The place once called Langenizze developed in the 10th century out of a hill fort at the Kahnstein mountain, erected by the Ottonian dynasty. Langelsheim was the site of historic ironworks, first documented in the 13th century, where ore from the Mines of Rammelsberg was smelted. The former municipalities Hahausen, Lutter am Barenberge and Wallmoden are part of Langelsheim since 1 November 2021.

Demographics
As of 30 June 2020 there were 11,305 inhabitants in Langelsheim.

Politics

Town council
2006 local elections:
 SPD: 17 seats
 CDU: 9 seats
2016 local elections:

SPD: 12
FDP: 1
WGL: 6
CDU: 7

Mayors
Since November 2013: Ingo Henze (SPD)
2006-2013: Henning Schrader (SPD)

International relations

Langelsheim is twinned with:
  Emmer-Compascuum, Emmen, Netherlands
  Nieuw-Weerdinge, Emmen, Netherlands
  Roswinkel, Emmen, Netherlands

Notable people

 Henry E. Steinway, (1797-1871), born Heinrich Engelhard Steinweg in Wolfshagen in Harz,  was a piano maker
 Jan Assmann, (born 1938), an Egyptologist
 Hans-Werner Bothe, (born 1952), philosopher and neurosurgeon
 Timo Rose, (born 1977), motion picture director and musician

References

External links

 

Towns in Lower Saxony
Goslar (district)
Towns in the Harz
Duchy of Brunswick